Giovanni Bottoia (born 9 May 1962) is an Italian former professional racing cyclist. He rode in one edition of the Tour de France, three editions of the Giro d'Italia and one edition of the Vuelta a España.

References

External links

1962 births
Living people
Italian male cyclists
Cyclists from Varese